Haripur can refer to:

Bangladesh
 Haripur, Bangladesh

India
 Haripur or Haripuram, a village in Srikakulam district, Andhra Pradesh
 Haripur, Bardhaman, a town in Bardhaman district, West Bengal
 Haripur, Chanditala-I, a village in Hooghly district, West Bengal
 Haripur, Cooch Behar, a village in Cooch Behar district, West Bengal
 Haripur, Bhopal, a village in Madhya Pradesh
 Mahua Dabra Haripura, Uttarakhand
 Haripur, Raebareli, a village in Raebareli district, Uttar Pradesh
 Haripur, Saharanpur, a village in Uttar Pradesh.
 Haripur, Jaunpur, a village in Uttar Pradesh

Nepal 
 Haripur, Sarlahi
 Haripur, Sunsari
 Haripur, Saptari

Pakistan
 Haripur District, a district of Khyber Pakhtunkhwa, Pakistan
 Haripur, Pakistan, a town in Khyber Pakhtunkhwa, Pakistan.